The least shrew tenrec (Microgale pusilla) is a species of mammal in the family Tenrecidae. It is endemic to Madagascar. Its natural habitats are subtropical or tropical moist forests, swamps, pastureland, and irrigated land.

References

Afrosoricida
Mammals of Madagascar
Mammals described in 1896
Taxonomy articles created by Polbot